"Labor Pains" is the fifth episode of the twenty-fifth season of the American animated television series The Simpsons and the 535th episode of the series. It originally aired on the Fox network in the United States on November 17, 2013. It was written by Mitch Glazer and Don Payne and directed by Matthew Faughnan.

In the episode, after a night of playing poker with Moe, Lenny, and Carl, Homer finds himself in an elevator with a young mother named Gretchen, who is in labor and needs someone to help her keep calm. Meanwhile, Lisa helps the local football cheerleading team unionize and negotiate for better wages and working conditions.

Plot
While playing poker one night with Moe, Barney, Lenny and Carl, Homer has a run of good luck and decides to leave the game with his winnings. A pregnant woman, Gretchen, enters the elevator with him to ride down to street level, but it gets stuck between floors, and she goes into labor. Based on what he can recall of the childbirth classes he took with Marge, Homer manages to deliver the baby himself, a healthy son. Later, after another poker night, Homer comes across Gretchen again and learns that she named her child after him. He begins to spend time with her, bringing baby items that he and Marge never used for their children, instead of going to the poker game.

Marge, thinking that Homer has sneaked out of work in favor of the game, discovers that he is in Gretchen's apartment and thinks at first that he is being unfaithful to her. However, she eventually learns the whole truth, and Homer takes his children and Homer Jr. to the zoo. Homer Jr. keeps eating Maggie's ice cream, so she smacks him out of the stroller. In a fit of anger, Homer Jr. pushes Maggie's stroller toward a prairie dog exhibit, but she manages to stop herself before she can roll into it. Marge forbids Homer to see Gretchen ever again, and he takes Homer Jr. back to the apartment, where he returns the baby to Gretchen and her husband - recently returned from a military deployment overseas. A dejected Homer returns home, where Maggie gives him a doll to nurture and quickly forgives him for not paying attention to her, and Homer Jr. surprises his father with his ability (learned from Homer) to open and pour a beer.

Meanwhile, Lisa taunts Bart with the fact that Milhouse has invited her to a Springfield Atoms football game. During the halftime show, the team's cheerleaders, the Atomettes, invite Lisa onto the field to take part in one of their routines. Lisa enjoys herself, but after the game, she discovers that the Atomettes are poorly paid. She persuades them to go on strike in order to force the team owner to grant them a better contract; the strategy succeeds, but in the meantime they begin to endorse many bizarre products and services, to Lisa's surprise and dismay. As the credits begin, several Atomette-sponsored items are shown.

Reception
Dennis Perkins of The A.V. Club gave the episode a C, saying "In the end, there’s no payoff to this storyline at all, except that Maggie seems to forgive Homer for neglecting her in favor of his new elevator family. (Her apparently customary daydream that Flanders is her dad changes to Homer while they hug.) It’s the sort of sweet emotional payoff a good Simpsons episode pulls off after building the story on a solid character foundation along the way. Maybe next week it'll be better."

The episode received a 1.8 rating and was watched by a total of 4.08 million people, making it the second most watched show on Animation Domination that night.

References

External links 
 
 "Labor Pains" at theSimpsons.com

2013 American television episodes
The Simpsons (season 25) episodes
Television episodes directed by Matthew Faughnan
Pregnancy-themed television episodes